Duchess of Grafton is the title given to the wife of the Duke of Grafton. Women who have held the title include:

Isabella FitzRoy, Duchess of Grafton (1668–1723)
Anne FitzPatrick, Countess of Upper Ossory (1737–1804), who was duchess from 1757 until her divorce in 1769.
Fortune FitzRoy, Duchess of Grafton (1920–2021)